Natak (lit:Drama) is a Pakistani television serial that was first aired on 3 December 2016. It airs every Saturday at 8:00pm PST. It stars Iqra Aziz, Junaid Khan and Moomal Khalid in lead roles.

Summary
Series explores the story of three individuals and revolves around a love triangle of Rohan, Suhana & Shafaq, Rohan (Junaid Khan) is Shafaq's (Iqra Aziz) Husband. She loves him and trust him blindly whereas Rohan is interested in his old love Suhana (Moomal Khalid) who is already married to Haider (Yasir Mazhar). willingly or unwillingly Haider becomes the victim of an accident by Rohan's car and losses his life. a series of events pass. During the last episode, Rohan  overhears suhanas plan of killing his child, and then realises that what he was doing was wrong. To punish himself and Suhana he purposely crashes the car with them inside. Suhana dies but Rohan survives.

Cast

Main
Iqra Aziz - Shafaq
Junaid Khan- Rohan
Moomal Khalid-

Recurring
Fazila Kaiser
Mizna Waqas
Hina Altaf
Yasir Mazhar
Asma Abbas

References

External links
 Natak on Hum.TV

2017 Pakistani television series debuts
Pakistani drama television series
Urdu-language television shows
Hum TV original programming